Air Transport Command was a United States Air Force unit created during World War II. 

Air Transport Command may also refer to:

I Troop Carrier Command, known as "Air Transport Command, United States Army Air Forces" from 30 April 1942 to 30 June 1942
Canadian Forces Air Transport Command, the "Air Transport Command" of the 'Canadian Armed Forces' of Canada
European Air Transport Command, a coordinating centre in Europe for five European armed forces founded 2010

See also
RAF Transport Command, Royal Air Force
Military Air Transport Command, French Air Force
Military Transport Aviation, Soviet Air Forces